La Murada is a village located in the municipality of Orihuela, in Alicante province, Valencian Community, Spain. As of 2020, it has a population of 3240.

Geography 
La Murada is located 60km west-southwest of Alicante.

References

Populated places in the Province of Alicante